Don't Look Behind You is a 1989 young adult thriller novel by Lois Duncan. It won a number of regional awards and was adapted into a television film in 1999.

Plot
This story starts out in Norwood, Virginia. April Corrigan is a 17-year-old girl who is an amazing tennis player with long blonde hair and is referred to as "Princess April." She's generally a smart and nice girl, albeit somewhat conceited.

As the story begins, April is a junior in high school, a hotshot player on her school's tennis team and is dating senior Steve Chandler. Her younger brother Bram is about 9 or 10. One day, April is signed out of school early by her maternal grandmother Lorelei. Her father, who works for the FBI, has been testifying against his boss in a drug smuggling case involving an airline; someone shot at him in the courtroom that day. Her FBI agent uncle thinks it would be safer if they were out of their house for the remainder of the trial. He relocates them to a hotel and assigns them a bodyguard.

As the trial goes on, the Corrigans become bored. April is resentful at being away from Steve. When her requests to call him are denied by their bodyguard, she surreptitiously writes and sends him a letter. A few days later, hitman Mike Vamp attempts to break into their hotel room. They are saved, but their bodyguard is killed.

April's uncle arranges for the Corrigans to go into Witness Protection. They are relocated to a small Florida town and advised to remain as anonymous as possible. This, combined with limited finances and a discovery that Steve and her former best friend are dating, makes April even more determined to re-connect with her old life.

Eventually, this becomes too much and she sets out to do so by flying back to Norwood with the intention of living with her maternal grandmother until she starts college. Upon arriving, she discovers that too much has changed for her to go back to her old life, and that she may have put her family in grave danger with her actions.

April and her grandmother set out for Florida. On the way back, they suspect they are being followed. They arrive and find the house empty. April's parents, upon discovering her ruse, have left to look for her. Before they can return, Vamp shows up. He reveals to April that he tracked them to the hotel they were staying at before due to her letter to Steve. This helps her realize how much trouble her self-centeredness has caused her and her family. She manages to escape from the house, but is caught by Vamp. She hits him over the head with a tennis racket. The blow kills him. Later on, she, her family and grandmother are reunited, and they move on with their lives.

Places
Multiple real places are a key part to the novel. The rural areas in the novel are the outskirts of eastern Virginia and to the south of Washington D.C. The cities in the novel are Richmond, Petersburg and Williamsburg in Virginia; Pittsburgh, Pennsylvania; Durham, North Carolina and Grove City and  St. Augustine in Florida. Other places in the novel are the Sarasota-Bradenton International Airport and Disneyworld.

Awards
The novel won the Tennessee Volunteer State Book Award in 1991 and 1993, the Iowa High School Book Master List in 1992, the Virginia Young Readers Program Award in 1992, the Indiana Young Hoosier Award in 1992, and the Texas Lone Star Reading List in 1991. The novel was nominated for the Washington Evergreen Young Adult Book Award in 1992, the Colorado Blue Spruce Young Adult Book Award in 1991 and 1992, and the Illinois Rebecca Caudill Young Readers Award in 1995.

Reception
In an interview with Lois Duncan, the interviewer said that the book was challenged for its immorality, graphic references, and sexual references. Lois Duncan thinks that it may have been a mix-up because there is only one part of the novel where it gets close to a sex scene.

Television film
The book was adapted into a 1999 television film of the same name. The film was directed by David Winning and stars Patrick Duffy, Pam Dawber and Dominic Raake. The film first aired on Fox Family on July 25, 1999.

Differences between the novel and the film

In the novel, April is the central character; she narrates the story from her own POV. In the film, April's dad is the main character.
In the novel, April's dad is named George Bramwell Corrigan, Senior. In the film, his name is Jeff Corrigan.
In the novel, April's sweetheart is named Steve. In the movie, his name is Stef.
In the novel, April and Steve part ways and she meets a young gentleman whose name is not given, being only referred to as "The Boy." In the movie, April and Stef are reunited
In the novel, April's mom is an author of books for children and teens. In the movie, she works for a company.
None of the FBI Agents from the novel - Max Barber, Tom Geist, Jim Peterson - are mentioned in the film.
In the novel, the hitman is named Mike Vamp. This name was changed for the film.

Connection with daughter Kaitlyn
The book is based on Lois Duncan's daughter Kaitlyn Arquette's personality. Arquette was shot to death shortly after the book was published while riding home from her friend's house. Duncan believes that Don't Look Behind You was a premonition of her daughter's death. Like the main character of the novel, Kaitlyn was chased by a hired gunman that resembled the killer that was on the cover of a paperback version.

Duncan investigated her daughter's death herself (after being unsatisfied with the police investigation), and wrote the non-fiction book Who Killed My Daughter? about the experience.

References

1989 American novels
American thriller novels
American young adult novels
1999 television films
1999 films
Novels set in Virginia
Novels by Lois Duncan
American novels adapted into films
Delacorte Press books
1990s English-language films